Major-General Clifford Cecil Malden  (1890 – 25 March 1941) was a British Army officer who served in both of the world wars.

Military career
Born in 1890 in Tunbridge Wells, Kent,  Malden was commissioned into the Royal Sussex Regiment on 4 April 1908 and saw service as a captain during the First World War.

He remained in the army during the interwar period and attended the Staff College, Camberley, from 1924 to 1925, as a student, and soon returned as an instructor. He played cricket and hockey for the British Army and, from 1934 to 1936 he was Commanding Officer of the 1st Battalion, Royal Sussex Regiment. In 1936 he went to England to attend the Imperial Defence College and was promoted to colonel in the same year and married the following year, the same year that he was to serve, until 1938, on the staff at the War Office.

He became Director of Infantry at the War Office in August 1939, shortly before the outbreak of the Second World War, Director of Military Training at the War Office in October and General Officer Commanding (GOC) of the 47th (London) Infantry Division, a Territorial Army formation, in November 1940. His command was destined to be short-lived, however, as he was inadvertently killed after setting off a mine at Shoreham-by-Sea in March 1941.

References

Bibliography

External links
Generals of World War II

1890 births
1941 deaths
Military personnel from Kent
Burials in East Sussex
British Army major generals
Royal Sussex Regiment officers
British Army generals of World War II
British Army personnel of World War I
British Army personnel killed in World War II
Landmine victims
Graduates of the Staff College, Camberley
War Office personnel in World War II
Graduates of the Royal College of Defence Studies
British Army cricketers
People from Shoreham-by-Sea
Deaths by explosive device
Academics of the Staff College, Camberley